Hostomice is a town in Beroun District in the Central Bohemian Region of the Czech Republic. It has about 1,800 inhabitants.

Administrative parts
Villages of Bezdědice, Lštěň and Radouš are administrative parts of Hostomice.

Geography
It lies mostly in the Hořovice Uplands, including the built-up area. The southern part of the municipal territory, which is hilly and forested, extends into the Brdy Highlands. The Chumava Brook flows through the town.

History
The first written mention of Hostomice is from 1343. From 1357 until the establishment of an independent municipality in 1850, Hostomice was part of the  Karlštejn estate. The village was promoted to a town in 1738. Historically, the town is associated with hand-made nails and pottery.

Sights
Hostomice has a unique town square, which belongs to the largest in the country. The main landmark of the town square is the Church of the Establishment of Saint Peter in Antioch. It is a late Baroque church with a later added tower and an Empire façade. Another landmarks of the town square are a Marian column and a statue of St. John of Nepomuk from 1871.

The Church of the Assumption of the Virgin Mary in Bezdědice was first mentioned in 1343. It is originally a Gothic building, which was rebuilt in the Baroque style after a fire in 1779.

There is a Jewish cemetery with 160 preserved tombstones at the southwestern municipal border.

Notable people
Václav Treitz (1819–1872), pathologist

References

External links

Cities and towns in the Czech Republic
Populated places in the Beroun District